Sybra distincta is a species of beetle in the family Cerambycidae. It was described by Takakuwa in 1984.

References

distincta
Beetles described in 1984